The 24th Dáil was elected at the November 1982 general election on 24 November 1982 and met on 14 December 1982. The members of Dáil Éireann, the house of representatives of the Oireachtas (legislature), of Ireland are known as TDs. On 20 January 1987, President Patrick Hillery dissolved the Dáil at the request of the Taoiseach Garret FitzGerald. The 24th Dáil lasted  days.

Composition of the 24th Dáil

Fine Gael and the Labour Party, denoted with bullets, formed the 19th Government of Ireland. Labour left the government on 20 January 1987, after which the Dáil was dissolved.

Ceann Comhairle
On the meeting of the Dáil, Tom Fitzpatrick (FG) was proposed by Garret FitzGerald (FG) and seconded by Peter Barry (FG) for the position of Ceann Comhairle. John O'Connell (Ind), who had served in the position in the previous two Dála, was proposed by Neil Blaney (IFF) and seconded by Charles Haughey (FF). Fitzpatrick was elected on a vote of 86 to 80.

Graphical representation
This is a graphical comparison of party strengths in the 24th Dáil from December 1982. This was not the official seating plan.

TDs by constituency
The list of the 166 TDs elected is given in alphabetical order by Dáil constituency.

Changes

See also
Members of the 17th Seanad

References

External links
Houses of the Oireachtas: Debates: 24th Dáil

 
24th Dáil
24